Arctodiaptomus burduricus is a species of crustacean in the family Diaptomidae. It is endemic to Lake Burdur, a saline lake in south-western Turkey.

References

Arthropods of Turkey
Diaptomidae
Crustaceans described in 1939
Freshwater crustaceans of Asia
Endemic fauna of Turkey
Taxonomy articles created by Polbot